Liu Huixia (born 30 November 1997) is a Chinese female diver. As the partner of Chen Ruolin at synchronized 10 metre platform, she won the gold medal at the 2013 World Championships in Barcelona and 2015 World Championships in Kazan. The pair were also champions at the 2016 Olympics in Rio de Janeiro. Liu was born in Daye, Hubei.

References

1997 births
Living people
People from Huangshi
Sportspeople from Hubei
Chinese female divers
Asian Games medalists in diving
2016 Olympic gold medalists for China
Divers at the 2016 Summer Olympics
Divers at the 2014 Asian Games
Olympic divers of China
Olympic medalists in diving
World Aquatics Championships medalists in diving
Asian Games gold medalists for China
Medalists at the 2014 Asian Games
21st-century Chinese women